Pseudoeurycea conanti is a species of salamander in the family Plethodontidae. It is endemic to Oaxaca, Mexico.

Its natural habitats are subtropical or tropical dry forests, subtropical or tropical moist montane forests, plantations, and heavily degraded former forest.
It is threatened by habitat loss.

References

conanti
Endemic amphibians of Mexico
Fauna of the Sierra Madre del Sur
Amphibians described in 1967
Taxa named by Charles Mitchill Bogert
Taxonomy articles created by Polbot